Keyonte Darnell George (born November 7, 2003) is an American college basketball player for the Baylor Bears of the Big 12 Conference. He was a consensus five-star recruit and one of the top players in the 2022 class.

High school career
George began playing high school basketball for Lewisville High School in Lewisville, Texas. As a freshman, he averaged 21 points, four rebounds and 1.9 steals per game, and was named District 6-6A Offensive Player of the Year. George averaged 23.9 points, 5.1 rebounds, 2.3 assists and 2.1 steals per game as a sophomore, earning District 6-6A MVP honors. For his junior season, he transferred to iSchool of Lewisville. George averaged 24.8 points per game as a junior. He moved to IMG Academy in Bradenton, Florida for his senior season.

Recruiting
George was a consensus five-star recruit and one of the top players in the 2022 class, according to major recruiting services. On August 8, 2021, he committed to playing college basketball for Baylor over offers from Texas, Texas Tech, Kansas and Kentucky.

College career
On January 11, 2023, George scored 32 points in a 83-78 victory over West Virginia. He was named Big 12 Freshman of the Year as well as Second Team All-Big 12.

National team career
In 3x3 basketball, George represented the United States at the 2021 FIBA 3x3 Under-18 World Cup in Hungary. He was named MVP after averaging a tournament-high 8.2 points per game and leading his team to a gold medal.

References

External links
Baylor Bears bio
USA Basketball bio

2003 births
Living people
American men's basketball players
Basketball players from Texas
Baylor Bears men's basketball players
IMG Academy alumni
McDonald's High School All-Americans
People from Lewisville, Texas
Shooting guards